Carl Maxie Brashear (January 19, 1931 – July 25, 2006) was a United States Navy sailor. He was a Master Diver, rising to the position in 1970, despite having his left leg amputated in 1966. The film Men of Honor was based on his life.

Early life and education
Brashear was born on January 19, 1931, in Tonieville, Kentucky, the sixth of 16 children to sharecroppers McDonald and Gonzella Brashear. In 1935, the family settled on a farm in Sonora, Kentucky. Brashear attended Sonora Grade School from 1937 to 1946.

Career

Brashear enlisted in the United States Navy on February 25, 1948, four months before the military would be desegregated by President Harry S. Truman. He graduated from the United States Navy Diving & Salvage School in 1954, becoming the first African-American to attend and graduate from the Diving & Salvage School and one of the first African-American United States Navy Divers.

While attending diving school in Bayonne, New Jersey, Brashear faced hostility and racism. He found notes on his bunk saying, "We're going to drown you today, nigger!" and "We don't want any nigger divers." Brashear received encouragement to finish from Boatswain's Mate First Class Harry M. Rutherford, and graduated 16 out of 17.

Brashear first worked as a diver retrieving approximately 16,000 rounds of ammunition that fell off a barge which had broken in half and sunk. On his first tour of shore duty in Quonset Point, Rhode Island, his duties included the salvaging of airplanes (including one Blue Angel) and recovering multiple dead bodies from the sea.

Brashear was assigned to escort the presidential yacht the Barbara Anne to Rhode Island. He met President Eisenhower and received a small knife that said, "To Carl M. Brashear. From Dwight D. Eisenhower, 1957. Many, many thanks." After making chief in 1959, he stayed at Guam for three years doing mostly demolition dives.

Leg amputation and recovery

In January 1966, in an accident now known as the Palomares incident, a B28 nuclear bomb was lost off the coast of Palomares, Spain, after two United States Air Force aircraft of the Strategic Air Command (SAC), a B-52G Stratofortress bomber and a KC-135A Stratotanker aerial refueling aircraft, collided during aerial refueling. Brashear was serving aboard  when it was dispatched to find and recover the missing bomb for the Air Force. The warhead was found after two and a half months of searching. For his service in helping to retrieve the bomb, Brashear was later awarded the Navy and Marine Corps Medal, the highest navy award for non-combat heroism.

During the bomb recovery operations on March 23, 1966, a line used for towing broke loose, causing a pipe to strike Brashear's left leg below the knee, nearly shearing it off. He was evacuated to Torrejon Air Base in Spain, then to the USAF Hospital at Wiesbaden Air Base, Germany; and finally to the Naval Hospital in Portsmouth, Virginia. Beset with persistent infection and necrosis, his lower left leg was eventually amputated.

Brashear remained at the Naval Regional Medical Center in Portsmouth from May 1966 until March 1967 recovering and rehabilitating from the amputation. From March 1967 to March 1968, Brashear was assigned to the Harbor Clearance Unit Two, Diving School, preparing for return to full active duty and diving. In April 1968, after a long struggle, Brashear was the first amputee diver to be recertified as a United States Navy diver. In 1970, he became possibly the first African-American master diver, (debated between him and John Henry Turpin) and served nine more years beyond that, achieving the rating of master chief boatswain's mate in 1971. Brashear was motivated by his beliefs that "It's not a sin to get knocked down; it's a sin to stay down" and "I ain't going to let nobody steal my dream."

Retirement
Brashear retired from the United States Navy on April 1, 1979, as a master chief petty officer (E-9) and master diver. He then served as a civilian employee for the government at Naval Station Norfolk, Norfolk, Virginia, and retired in 1993 with the grade of GS-11.

Personal life
Brashear married and divorced three times: Junetta Wilcoxson (1952–1978), Hattie R. Elam (1980–1983), and Jeanette A. Brundage (1985–1987). He had four children: Shazanta (1955–1996), DaWayne, Phillip, and Patrick. Brashear's grand-nephew is a retired professional ice hockey player Donald Brashear.

Brashear died of respiratory and heart failure at the Naval Medical Center Portsmouth, Portsmouth, Virginia, on July 25, 2006. He is buried at Woodlawn Memorial Gardens in Norfolk, Virginia.

Carl Brashear Foundation
After his death, his sons DaWayne and Phillip Brashear started the Carl Brashear Foundation in his honor.

Decorations and awards

8 gold service stripes.

Honors
Brashear was honored with the Secretary of Defense Medal for Outstanding Public Service in October 2000 for 42 years of combined military and federal civilian service. The award was presented by Secretary of Defense William Cohen.

The Lewis and Clark-class dry cargo ship USNS Carl Brashear (T-AKE-7) was christened in his honor in San Diego, California, on September 18, 2008. General Dynamics delivered the completed ship to the Navy on March 4, 2009.

On February 21, 2009, Nauticus, a science and maritime museum in downtown Norfolk, Virginia, opened a new exhibit called "Dream to Dive: The Life of Master Diver Carl Brashear." It is the first full-scale museum exhibit dedicated to Brashear.

In 2009 the Chief Petty Officer Club onboard Naval Station Little Creek VA was renamed The Carl Brashear Center. Carl's son and several friends gave speeches at and attended the renaming ceremony. Carl was known to frequent the CPO Club onboard Little Creek up until the time of his death.

On November 9, 2017, the Commonwealth of Kentucky dedicated the "Carl M. Brashear Radcliff Veterans Center" in honor of BMCM (MDV) Carl Brashear. Construction on the new center, which is located about 30 miles from Brashear's hometown of Sonora, was completed about a year before the dedication ceremony. On hand was his son Phillip, Founder of the Brashear Foundation, Kentucky Lt. Gov. Jenean Hampton, Veterans Center Administrator Israel Ray, members of the Brashear family, along with members of the Combat Veterans Motorcycle Association who nominated and worked to collect over 7,000 signatures in support of naming the center after Brashear.

On July 25, 2018, Lincoln Parkway bridge, just outside Tonieville, KY was renamed the "Master Chief Petty Officer Carl Maxie Brashear Memorial Bridge."

Brashear's Dress Uniform is on display at the Hardin County History Museum in Elizabethtown, Kentucky as part of the "We Were There" Military Tribute and Exhibit.

Oris SA released the Oris Carl Brashear Cal. 401 Limited Edition dive watch to commemorate Brashear.

In popular culture
Cuba Gooding Jr. plays the role of Brashear in Men of Honor, a movie inspired by the life of Carl Brashear.

See also

Notes

References
Stillwell, Paul. The Reminiscences of Master Chief Boatswain's Mate Carl Brashear. Annapolis, MD: United States Institute. 1998.
 Facts & fiction — real life versus the movie.
 Brashear's NHC profile. 
 
 
Brashear has a Pedigree of Greatness
Firehouse.com "Unit Bio – Fireboat-1 Carl Brashear"
Hampton Roads TV, October 24, 2007.

External links

Story of Carl Brashear with rare photos from U.S. National Archives and the US Navy

1931 births
2006 deaths
American underwater divers
American amputees
People from LaRue County, Kentucky
Recipients of the Navy and Marine Corps Medal
United States Navy sailors
20th-century African-American sportspeople
21st-century African-American people
African-American United States Navy personnel
African Americans in the Korean War